Louie Palmer (born 22 November 1985) is an English drummer and session musician.

Biography 
Palmer began playing the drums aged five, learning drumming from his father. He played drums in school jazz orchestras, and received an endorsement from Zildjian aged 17. He performed at various drum clinic events with former Style Council drummer Steve White.

In 2004, Palmer moved to Boston to study drumming at the Berklee College of Music. After returning to the UK, he played with former Sting sideman Jason Rebello, Gary Husband and Laurence Cottle.

Palmer has also studied with Thomas Lang, Dave Weckl, Peter Erskine and Virgil Donati. He returned to the US in 2013 to play with US Jazz guitarist Mike Stern.

In 2014 he recorded with saxophonist Nelson Rangell with Mitchel Forman, Randy Brecker and Bob James.

Palmer currently resides in Los Angeles and runs his online drum school - playbetterdrums.com - in addition to recording and touring work.

In 2018 he performed at the Baked Potato for the first time as a leader with Mitch Forman, Luis Conte, Brandon Fields and Janek Gwizdala.

2021 Equipment
Palmer endorses Pearl drums, Meinl cymbals, Pro Mark sticks, Evans drum heads, Alclair in-ears  and Earthworks microphones.

Drums
Pearl Masterworks Studio Drum Set (maple/gum shells)
 1× 22″ × 16″ Bass Drum
 1× 18″ × 14″ Bass Drum
 1× 10″ × 7″ Tom
 1× 12″ × 8″ Tom
 1× 13″ × 9″ Tom
 1× 14″ × 14″ Floor Tom
 1× 16″ × 16″ Floor Tom
 1× 14″ × 5.5″ Snare Drum

Cymbals
 14" Byzance Traditional Medium bottom over Extra Dry bottom
 20" Byzance Vintage Pure Crash
 23" Byzance Traditional Medium Ride
 20" Byzance Dark Crash
 20" Byzance Vintage Crash
 22" Byzance Jazz China Ride

Drumheads
 Evans UV1 on Snare Drums & Toms
 Evans UV1 or G1 on Bass Drum

Sticks
 Pro Mark 'Bob Gatzen' signature stick

Microphones
Earthworks
 DM20 on toms and snare
 SR25 as overheads
 SR20LS for bass drum
 2x TC20 for room mics

Discography
 Time of Spring by Baki Duyarlar (2011)
 MW Trio by Marcus Wolf (2014)
 Red by Nelson Rangell (2014)
 Blue by Nelson Rangell (2014)
 Salvation by Malcolm Bruce (2017)
 A Lifetime Away by Ruslan Sirota (2017)
 Me and My Radio by Anthony Strong (2019)
 Light by Nelson Rangell (2019)

References

External links 
 Louie Palmer Online Drum School
 Louie Palmer on Instagram
 Louie Palmer on Facebook
 Louie Palmer on YouTube
 

1985 births
Living people
English drummers
British male drummers
21st-century drummers
21st-century British male musicians